4674 Pauling, provisional designation , is a spheroidal binary Hungaria asteroid from the innermost regions of the asteroid belt, approximately 4.5 kilometers in diameter. It was discovered by American astronomer Eleanor Helin at the U.S Palomar Observatory, California, on 2 May 1989, and named after American chemist and Nobel Laureate Linus Pauling.

Orbit and classification 

The bright E-type asteroid is a member of the Hungaria family, which form the innermost dense concentration of asteroids in the Solar System. It orbits the Sun in the inner main-belt at a distance of 1.7–2.0 AU once every 2 years and 6 months (926 days). Its orbit has an eccentricity of 0.07 and an inclination of 19° with respect to the ecliptic. The first precovery was taken at Palomar Observatory in 1985, extending the asteroid's observation arc by 4 years prior to its discovery.

Diameter and albedo 

According to the surveys carried out by NASA's space-based Spitzer and WISE telescopes, the asteroid measures between 4.2 and 4.8 kilometers in diameter and has a surface albedo of 0.17 to 0.39.

Lightcurve 

Several rotational lightcurves for this asteroids were obtained from photometric observations between 2005 and 2015, most notably by Italian astronomer Silvano Casulli and American astronomer Brian Warner at the U.S. Palmer Divide Observatory, Colorado. The lightcurves gave a rotation period of 2.531–2.533 hours with an exceptionally low brightness amplitude of less than 0.01 in magnitude, indicating that the body has a nearly spheroidal shape.

Moon 

In 2004, a team of astronomers at ESO's Very Large Telescope, Chile, announced that Pauling is orbited by a small asteroid moon. The moon has received a provisional designation for natural satellites: S/2004 (4674) 1. It was believed to measure 2.5 kilometers in diameter (now rather 1.5 km, since the primary's size estimate has been reduced from 8 to 4.5 kilometers) and to orbit Pauling at a distance of 250 kilometers once every 1200 hours.

Naming 

This minor planet is named in honor of American chemist, biochemist, peace activist, author, educator, and multiple Nobel Laureate, Linus Pauling (1901–1994). The naming took place on the occasion of his 90th birthday. Pauling had a renowned and several decade long career at Caltech, and was leading its Department of Chemistry and Chemical Engineering. In 1954 and 1962, he received the Nobel Prize in Chemistry and the Nobel Peace Prize, respectively. Astronomer Eleanor Helin was one of his admirers. The approved naming citation was published by the Minor Planet Center on 30 March 1991.

Notes

References

External links 
 Lightcurve plot of 4674 Pauling, Palmer Divide Observatory, B. D. Warner (2010)
 (4674) Pauling, datasheet, johnstonsarchive.net
 Asteroids with Satellites, Robert Johnston, johnstonsarchive.net
 Asteroid Lightcurve Database (LCDB), query form (info )
 Dictionary of Minor Planet Names, Google books
 Asteroids and comets rotation curves, CdR – Observatoire de Genève, Raoul Behrend
 Discovery Circumstances: Numbered Minor Planets (1)-(5000) – Minor Planet Center
 
 

004674
Discoveries by Eleanor F. Helin
Named minor planets
004674
19890502